The Book of Common Prayer of 1928 was a proposed revised version of the 1662 Book of Common Prayer of the Church of England.

Overview
The proposed revision was approved in 1927 by the Church Assembly but rejected by Parliament. Its authorisation was defeated in the House of Commons for a second time on 14 June 1928.

In order to reduce conflict with traditionalists, it was decided that the form of service to be used would be determined by the incumbent and the parochial church council, with the older 1662 forms of services continuing to be available alongside the 1928 forms.

Since the Church of England Assembly (Powers) Act 1919 required measures affecting the Book of Common Prayer to be approved by Parliament before receiving royal assent, the measure authorising its use, together with an annexed copy (a "Deposited Book"), was submitted to Parliament. The House of Lords approved the Book by a large majority, but the corresponding resolution in the House of Commons was defeated by 33 votes on 15 December 1927. The Home Secretary, William Joynson-Hicks (later Viscount Brentford), and Rosslyn Mitchell "reached and inflamed all the latent Protestant prejudices in the House" and argued strongly against it, largely in opposition to the Roman practice of the "reserved sacrament" which the Book would have legalised in the Church of England, albeit in a limited fashion and for the specific purpose of communion of the sick only. 

The prayer book was submitted again the following year and defeated a second time in the Commons on 14 June 1928.

In 1966, with some changes, many services from the 1928 book were authorised as legal for public worship as the First Series of Alternative Services, and subsequently continued in use through authorisation by inclusion in the Alternative Service Book and its successor, Common Worship.

References

Further reading 

 Joynson-Hicks, William, The Prayer Book Crisis. London: Putnam, 1928

1928 non-fiction books
1928 in Christianity
20th-century Christian texts
Book of Common Prayer
Church of England publications
History of the Church of England
Oxford University Press books